Sir William Lowther, 1st Baronet (8 June 1663 – 6 March 1729) was an English landowner from Swillington, West Yorkshire, and a baronet in the Baronetage of Great Britain.

He was the eldest son of Sir William Lowther by his wife, Catherine Harrison.

He was educated in Yorkshire at Barwick-in-Elmet School, before being admitted to Christ's College, Cambridge, on 17 May 1681. Eighteen months later, on 14 December 1682, he was admitted to Gray's Inn, one of the professional bodies for English lawyers.

In 1691, he married Hon. Amabella Maynard (d. 1734), daughter of Banastre Maynard, 3rd Baron Maynard, and had five children:
Sir William Lowther, 2nd Baronet (c. 1694 – 1763)
Henry Lowther, MD, of Newcastle (d. 1743)
John Lowther, governor of Surat, no issue
and two daughters, Amabella and Jane, who both died unmarried.

He served as High Sheriff of Yorkshire for 1697–8, and was returned to the Parliament of England and the later Parliament of Great Britain for Pontefract over seven parliamentary sessions from 1701 to 1710 and from 1716 until his death. He was created a baronet on 6 January 1715.

He died on 6 March 1729, and was succeeded in the baronetcy by his eldest son, William. Amabella, Lady Lowther, died on 8 August 1734.

Arms
His coat of arms was: Or six annulets Sable, arranged as three, two and one.

References

Further reading
Cruikshanks, Eveline; Harrison, Richard (2002) "LOWTHER, William II (1663–1729), of Swillington, Yorks." in The History of Parliament: the House of Commons 1690-1715, edited by D. Hayton, E. Cruickshanks, S. Handley

Alumni of Christ's College, Cambridge
Baronets in the Baronetage of Great Britain
Members of Gray's Inn
Members of the Parliament of Great Britain for English constituencies
1663 births
1729 deaths
British MPs 1707–1708
British MPs 1708–1710
British MPs 1715–1722
British MPs 1722–1727
British MPs 1727–1734
High Sheriffs of Yorkshire
English landowners
William
English MPs 1701–1702
English MPs 1702–1705
English MPs 1705–1707